Stehling is a surname. It may refer to:

Felix Stehling (1927–2012), American businessman and restaurateur
Henry J. Stehling (1918–2001), Brigadier General in the United States Air Force
Moritz Stehling (born 1987), German football player